Julia Cho (born July 5, 1975) is an American playwright and television writer. In March 2020 she was awarded the Windham-Campbell Literature Prize.

Select full length plays

99 Histories (2002)

99 Histories is a drama portraying the narratives of Eunice, a young woman who discovers her unexpected pregnancy. She recalls her childhood as a musical prodigy, but soon finds out about the negative and dark past that she endured through. This play explores the themes of memory, the emotional bond between mother and child, and a Korean cultural concept of Chung. According to Julia Cho, herself in her interview with LA Times, Chung is “what exists between people who are so closely bonded that, for better or worse, each is essential to the other’s achieving full self-hood.”

Before the official premier, 99 Histories was presented as a staged reading at Mark Taper Forum (2001), Sundance Institute Theatre Lab (2001), New York Theatre Workshop (2002), and South Coast Repertory's Pacific Playwrights Festival (2002). It premiered from April 9 to 25 of 2004 at the Theater Mu, located in Saint Paul, Minnesota, directed by Cecilie D. Keenan.

The Language Archive (2009)

The Language Archive depicts a dedicated linguist, George, who is unable to express himself after the break-up of his marriage. The play won the Susan Smith Blackburn Prize in 2010. It premiered at Roundabout Theater Company directed by Mark Brokaw in 2010, and was staged at National Theatre Studio by Andrea Ferran in 2013.

Office Hour (2016)

Office Hour was Julia Cho's reaction to the Virginia Tech mass-shooting in 2007. This play consists of four characters. Cho writes specifically about Gina's attempts to converse with Dennis and convince him to attend her office hours. It addresses the concept of “good” and “bad” as well as the violent tendencies that Dennis possesses. It explores the reason that college students may resort to violence. Cho also tries to address the widely held misconception that most mass shooters are caucasian males. This exploration is done through casting Ki-Hong Lee, a Korean American actor, for the role of Dennis in the premiere performances.

Aubergine (2017)

Aubergine (2017) is a play that explores the concept of Asian American identity through family and memory. She specifically states that “The play at its core is also just a play about life: about the things that we carry with us, the things that we eat, and why we eat the things we eat.” Discussion of food and identity in Aubergine incorporates the discussion of diaspora, which can be characterized by individuals’ experiences away from their homeland. Cho expands on the concept of 1.5 and second generations of Korean American immigrants throughout the play.

She focuses on the discussion of identity issues through dramaturgically assigning roles that food serves in increasing accessibility of the conversation as a whole. Her writing explores themes that are universal in nature through “constructing different subjectivity” that evokes sympathy regardless of one's identity. Julia Cho was one of the five playwrights whose works were performed as parts of “Korea Diaspora Season” in National Theater Company of Korea in Yongsan-Gu, Seoul. Aubergine returned to the National Theater of Korea on March 6, 2018.

Other full length plays

BFE (2003) 

BFE depicts the life of a fourteen-year-old girl, Panny. Julia Cho explores the concept of childhood and adulthood through the narratives of Panny's first-year experience at a high school.

The Architecture of Loss (2004) 

The Architecture of Loss consists of reminiscent and multitude of perspectives through the lenses of Greg, a father whose son disappears. This play depicts the day that his son returns home and tries to address the aftermaths and influences that his disappearance had had on the family as a whole. The sense of loss is explored through not only the literal disappearance of a person but also through the effects that an incident like that has on the remaining family.

Durango (2006) 

Durango is a play about a Korean immigrant, Boo-Seng Lee's narrative about his immigrant experiences as a single father with two sons. Expectations based on the idea of the “American Dream” against the reality is clearly demonstrated through his experiences in the American southwest.

The Winchester House (2006) 

The Winchester House is V's story—a narrative about her contemplation of her identity and its development. When she is given the chance to examine and confront her past, she is also given a choice: to tell the same, original narrative or to tell a new one.

The Piano Teacher (2007) 

The Piano Teacher is about Mrs. K's nostalgia and the effects of her decision to contact her former piano students. Memories can be a positive force that reduces sense of loneliness and solitude—it can also be a negative force that opens up the possibilities of darker truths.

Screen writing 
As a screenwriter, Cho has written for the television series Big Love and Fringe, along with the animated film Turning Red.

Themes
Julia Cho's plays are described to make no explicit recognition or celebration of Korea, but rather naturally embedded in the stories by Mee Won Lee, Korean theatre studies professor at Korea National University of Arts. Her works specifically depict women influenced by the Korean diaspora. BFE, for instance, depicts a Korean American woman who had to endure through exorcized stereotypes about Asian women. Another example is Nora, the female protagonist of The Architecture of Loss, who immigrated to the United States following her marriage to an American soldier. 99 Histories illustrate the life of Eunice, former cello prodigy, struggling through depression and unsettlement in her family.

Notable works and collaborators

Personal life
, Cho and her husband live in West Los Angeles.

See also
 List of Big Love episodes: (i) episode 41-"Blood Atonement" and (ii) episode 45-"A Seat at the Table".
 List of Fringe episodes: (i) #5 "Power Hungry", (ii) #9 "The Dreamscape", (iii) #15 "Inner Child".

References

External links
 
 "15 minutes with ...Julia Cho", Theater Times, Cristofer Gross
 "East meets west", Time Out New York
 "In Dialogue: Tea in the Desert with Julia Cho" interview by Eisa Davis, The Brooklyn Rail, May 2005.

American dramatists and playwrights of Korean descent
American television writers
Amherst College alumni
Juilliard School alumni
Living people
Tisch School of the Arts alumni
Writers from Santa Monica, California
University of California, Berkeley alumni
American women dramatists and playwrights
American women television writers
American people of Korean descent
Screenwriters from California
1975 births